"Run, Chris, Run" is the nineteenth episode of the fourteenth season of the animated sitcom Family Guy, and the 268th episode overall. It aired on Fox in the United States on May 15, 2016, and is written by Damien Fahey and directed by Julius Wu. The title is a play on the 1998 German film Run Lola Run.

Plot
During lunchtime at school, Principal Shepherd reminds the students to nominate for this year's homecoming king. After a brief discussion, Chris is nominated by just his best friend Neil Goldman. At home, Chris announces the news to Lois, Brian, and Stewie, to Lois' concern. The next day, Chris unexpectedly wins the election, to the surprise of Lois, Brian, and Stewie, who had come to console him after he lost.

Meanwhile, at the Drunken Clam, Cleveland leaves for a moment to go to the bathroom. Peter, Joe, and Quagmire head out, leaving Cleveland to pay the bill for the boys. Cleveland complains to Jerome, and they bond over more drinks. Later, Cleveland ditches his friends to hang out with Jerome, surprising them. Wanting to get Cleveland back, they decide to try and win him back through antics such as dancing foolishly on his lawn. All of these efforts are met with failure as Cleveland continues to spend time with Jerome.

At home, Lois and Peter give Chris plenty of respect and congratulations for his success, causing him to act like a King. Meg however is skeptical about the votes, saying that they are part of an elaborate prank by the popular students, on account of the high school's liking of "making unpopular kids look stupid". Brian and Stewie go to the school to clarify this. They attempt to disguise themselves and sneak in, but Brian gets distracted by two attractive teen girls and is subsequently thrown out of the school. At night, they see a news story about Chris, 'a big guy with a heart of dreams', becoming homecoming king, and realize after hearing his interviewed classmates responses that he was elected because they pitied him upon knowing of his "records". When Chris comes home he continues to believe he is a King of high importance and power, to Stewie and Brian's irritation. The next day, an exasperated Brian reveals the truth to a skeptical Chris, who refuses to believe it.

After Peter, Joe, and Quagmire unsuccessfully attempt a third method to get Cleveland back, they address the idea that Cleveland may be hanging out with Jerome because they're both black people. They head to the Brown house dressed like famous black people to win Cleveland back, but he reveals that he is still angry about the unsettled bar tab he was stuck with and feels Jerome is a better friend. That night, Cleveland tells Jerome of the guys' theory and learns that there's some truth behind it, as Jerome personally considers Cleveland boring but feels a connection to him because of their shared race nonetheless.

Brian and Stewie attend the homecoming dance after Stewie realizes that they were a little too harsh on him and should support him anyway. Principal Shepherd introduces Chris as the prom king. However, when Chris steps up to give another bizarre speech, his classmates give sympathetic comments. When Principal Shepard introduces the Homecoming Queen, which turns out to be a memorial to a girl who died in a car accident, it dawns on him that they merely elected him because they thought he was mentally challenged just like his father and wanted him to feel good about himself. Outside the school, Chris reconciles with Stewie and Brian, having learned from the experience that he doesn't need pity, just support from his family and friends.

After reuniting and patching things up with his friends at the Griffins' house, Cleveland plays Double Dribble with Peter, where Peter takes advantage of a glitch. Peter starts to win, but hits a wrong button at the last minute before the episode ends.

Reception
The episode received an audience of 2.65 million, making it the second-most watched show on Fox that night behind The Simpsons.

Controversy
Fox received complaints after the original video of the Double Dribble gameplay was used in the episode, from which the video of YouTube content creator 'sw1tched's channel was taken down due to a copyright claim. Fox later released a public statement that the copyright claim had been made by a programmed bot that looks for any possible stolen Family Guy clips, and that Fox slapped the copyright claim unwittingly. Seth MacFarlane also apologized for the incident on Twitter, saying that he was out of the country and was unable to get the issue resolved sooner. The original video has since been restored.

References

External links 
 

2016 American television episodes
Family Guy (season 14) episodes